Michael O'Leary may refer to: 

Michael John O'Leary (1890–1961), Irish-Canadian recipient of the Victoria Cross
Michael O'Leary (politician) (1936–2006), Irish politician and leader of the Irish Labour Party, 1981–82
Michael O'Leary (writer) (born 1950), New Zealand publisher, poet and novelist
Michael O'Leary (actor) (born 1958), actor in the long-running American soap opera Guiding Light
Michael O'Leary (businessman) (born 1961), CEO of low-cost Irish airline Ryanair
Michael O'Leary (pioneer) (1858-1930), Australian pioneer
Michael O'Leary, a character played by Humphrey Bogart in the 1939 film Dark Victory